Sharmat is a surname. Notable people with the surname include: 

Craig Sharmat (born 1957), American musician
Marjorie W. Sharmat (1928–2019), American children's writer